Mikhalkov is a Russian noble family, which is known from the end of the 15th century.   Many of their scions worked for the Soviet Union and modern Russia.

Among notable Mikhalkovs are:
Sergei Mikhalkov — the author of National Anthem of the Soviet Union, current National Anthem of Russia and children poetry;
Mikhail Mikhalkov — the younger brother of Sergei, Soviet spy and a writer;
Nikita Mikhalkov — an actor and a filmmaker, a son of Sergei;
Andrei Mikhalkov-Konchalovsky — a filmmaker,  a son of Sergei;
 Nadezhda Mikhalkova — an actress, a daughter of Nikita;
 Anna Mikhalkova — an actress, a daughter of Nikita;
 Julia Mikhalkova — an actress and TV presenter;

References 

Russian noble families